Rain Stones is a 1991 short story collection by Australian author Jackie French. It is notable for being the first children's book written by the author.

Background 

Jackie French began writing Rain Stones (having previously written only gardening books) when she was 30, in a desperate attempt to get enough money together to register her car. At the time, she was living in a tin shed with a black snake named Gladys and a wombat named Smudge.

Awards and nominations 

 Shortlisted - NSW Premier's Literary Awards: Children's Book Award (1991)
 Shortlisted - CBCA Children's Book of the Year Award: Younger Readers(1992)
 Shortlisted - West Australian Young Readers' Book Award: Primary Age Group (1993)

References

External links 
 

1991 short story collections
Australian short story collections
Australian children's books
Short story collections by Jackie French
1991 children's books
Children's short story collections